Samhung Station is a station on Hyŏksin Line of the Pyongyang Metro.

Nearby Attractions

The station is located in front of the Pyongyang University of Foreign Studies and across the street from Kim Il Sung University.

References

Pyongyang Metro stations
Railway stations opened in 1975
1975 establishments in North Korea